Temple Valley is a hamlet in the South Downs in Hampshire, England. The hamlet lies 3.2 miles (5 km) east of Winchester, its county town, on the A31 road. It is in the civil parish of Itchen Valley.

City of Winchester
Villages in Hampshire